Diospyros hillebrandii, is a species of flowering tree in the ebony family, Ebenaceae, that is endemic to the islands of Oahu and Kauai in Hawaii.

References

External links

hillebrandii
Plants described in 1939
Endemic flora of Hawaii
Trees of Hawaii
Flora without expected TNC conservation status